The National Tractor Pullers Association (NTPA) is a national tractor pulling sanctioning body in the United States. It was born of a need to unify the rules and classes in the sport of truck and tractor pulling.

History
The NTPA was founded in 1969 by representatives of eight states (Illinois, Indiana, Iowa, Michigan, Minnesota, Missouri, Ohio, and Pennsylvania) to establish uniform rules and provide structure to the sport of truck and tractor pulling.  Throughout the years, the NTPA has been instrumental in implementation of safety standards in the sport, and is the governing body from which most other truck and tractor pulling organizations, foreign or domestic, copy their rules.  Since 1987, the NTPA has been managed by the World Pulling International, Inc, which also is a marketing department and publications department of the NTPA.

See also
Tractor Pulling
RFD-TV
Lucas Oil Pro Pulling League

References

External links

NTPA Website
RFD-TV's Website

Tractor pulling
Sports governing bodies in the United States